Boys and Girls is the sixth solo studio album by English singer and songwriter Bryan Ferry, released on 3 June 1985 by E.G. Records. The album was Ferry's first solo album in seven years and the first since he had disbanded his band Roxy Music in 1983. The album was Ferry's first and only number one solo album in the UK. It was certified Platinum by the British Phonographic Industry (BPI) and contains two UK top 40 hit singles. It is also Ferry's most successful solo album in the US, having been certified Gold for sales in excess of half a million copies there.

The album contained the track "Slave to Love", which became one of Ferry's most popular solo hits. The single was released on 29 April 1985 and spent nine weeks in the UK charts in 1985, peaking at number 10, along with the other (modestly successful) singles "Don't Stop the Dance" and "Windswept".

The guitar solo at the end of "Slave to Love" featured Neil Hubbard and the album featured other famous guitarists such as Mark Knopfler of Dire Straits, David Gilmour of Pink Floyd, Nile Rodgers of Chic and Keith Scott from Bryan Adams' band.

The album was remastered and re-released in 2000, and was also re-released on the SACD format in 2005.

Critical reception

Writing retrospectively for AllMusic, critic Ned Raggett complimented the track "Slave to Love" and wrote "As a whole, Boys and Girls fully established the clean, cool vision of Ferry on his own to the general public. Instead of ragged rock explosions, emotional extremes, and all that made his '70s work so compelling in and out of Roxy, Ferry here is the suave, debonair if secretly moody and melancholic lover, with music to match."

Critic Robert Christgau wrote: "His voice thicker and more mucous, his tempos dragging despite all the fancy beats he's bought, he runs an ever steeper risk of turning into the romantic obsessive he's always played so zealously."

The 1992 edition of the Rolling Stone Album Guide gave the album three and half stars out of five: "Set in the richly synthesized mode of Avalon, Ferry's sixth album envelopes the listener in emotional subtleties and sonic nuance. Then it's over like a pleasant dream. Boys and Girls could stand a couple of more tunes along the memorable lines of "Slave to Love" or "Don't Stop the Dance." The 2004 New Rolling Stone Album Guide repeated the three-and-a-half star rating; "Boys and Girls, his first solo album after Roxy Music broke up, was his disco-friendly bid for solo stardom, and while it's too fluffy, it does have one of his greatest love songs ever, the hypnotic slow-dance "Slave to Love."

In the 1985 Pazz & Jop Critics Poll by the Village Voice it was voted the 31st best album of the year.

2006 surround-sound remix
In 2006, Virgin reissued Boys and Girls on Hybrid Super Audio CD (SACD) with a new 5.1-channel surround sound remix by the original production team of Rhett Davies (the producer) and Bob Clearmountain (the mixing engineer). The original 1985 stereo mix is left intact and is the same for the CD layer and for the HD layer, allegedly being transferred from analogue master tapes to DSD and processed in DSD throughout.

Track listing
All songs written by Bryan Ferry, except where noted.

Personnel

Musicians
 Bryan Ferry – vocals, keyboards, percussion
 Jon Carin – keyboards
 Guy Fletcher – keyboards 
 Chester Kamen – guitars
 Nile Rodgers – lead guitar 
 Neil Hubbard – lead guitar 
 Keith Scott – lead guitar 
 David Gilmour – lead guitar 
 Mark Knopfler – lead guitar 
 Tony Levin – bass 
 Neil Jason – bass
 Marcus Miller – bass
 Alan Spenner – bass
 Andy Newmark – drums 
 Omar Hakim – drums 
 Jimmy Maelen – percussion
 David Sanborn – saxophone 
 Martin McCarrick – cello
 Anne Stephenson – strings
 Virginia Hewes – backing vocals
 Ednah Holt – backing vocals
 Fonzi Thornton – backing vocals
 Ruby Turner – backing vocals
 Alfa Anderson – backing vocals
 Michelle Cobbs – backing vocals
 Yanick Etienne – backing vocals
 Colleen Fitz-Charles – backing vocals
 Lisa Fitz-Charles – backing vocals
 Simone Fitz-Charles – backing vocals

Technical
 Bryan Ferry – production
 Rhett Davies – production, engineering
 Bob Clearmountain – engineering, mixing
 Neil Dorfsman – engineering
 Femi Jiya – engineering
 Andy Lydon – engineering
 Dominick Maita – engineering
 Brian McGee – engineering
 Benjamin Armbrister – engineering assistance
 Andy "Carb" Cannell – engineering assistance
 Steve Churchyard – engineering assistance
 Randy Ezratty – engineering assistance
 Dave Greenberg – engineering assistance
 Kevin Killen – engineering assistance
 Heff Moraes – engineering assistance
 Peter Revill – engineering assistance
 Kendal Stubbs – engineering assistance
 Bob Ludwig – mastering at Masterdisk (New York City)

Artwork
 Bryan Ferry – art direction
 Simon Puxley – art direction
 Cream – artwork
 Antony Price – photography

Charts

Weekly charts

Year-end charts

Certifications

References

Bibliography

External links

1985 albums
Bryan Ferry albums
Albums produced by Rhett Davies
E.G. Records albums